La Cérémonie is a 1995 crime drama film by Claude Chabrol, adapted from the 1977 novel A Judgement in Stone by Ruth Rendell. The film echoes the case of Christine and Lea Papin, two French maids who brutally murdered their employer's wife and daughter in 1933, as well as the 1947 play they inspired, The Maids by Jean Genet.

Plot 

La Cérémonie tells the story of a young woman, Sophie Bonhomme (Sandrine Bonnaire), who is hired as a maid by the Lelièvre family. The Lelièvres live in an isolated mansion in Brittany. The family consists of four members: Catherine (Jacqueline Bisset) and Georges, the parents, who have no children together, but one each from previous marriages. Gilles is Catherine's and her ex-husband's son. He is a lonely teenager who loves reading and has a passion for arts in general. Melinda is Georges' and his late wife's daughter. She studies at a university and only spends the weekends at home, where she invites her boyfriend Jérémie. The household chores are excessive for Catherine – who owns her own art gallery – so she requires a maid's help and hires Sophie. Throughout the film Sophie avoids using the dishwasher, refuses to take driving lessons, buys fake eyeglasses, and has trouble giving a cashier the correct change. The viewer finds out later that Sophie is illiterate and has a history of violence since she is believed to have killed her disabled father, or at least not to have rescued him from the fire she might have set in his house.

Once in the small village, Sophie meets Jeanne (Isabelle Huppert), the postmistress, who occasionally works in a charity and reads a lot. However, Jeanne proves to be a bad influence on the maid since she is jealous and aggressive towards a lot of people, including the Lelièvres, whose mail she vandalises. She also has a violent history: she was charged with the murder of her four-year-old daughter, but she was later acquitted. The two friends meet regularly either for a charity project (that they end up ruining) or for a film; television being Sophie's main pastime. Sophie is treated rather nicely at the Lelièvres, who mean well towards her, but their patronizing attitude and the affection they have for each other create a feeling of jealousy and frustration both in Sophie and in Jeanne. This frustration reaches its climax when Georges fires Sophie for attempting to blackmail Melinda, who found out about her illiteracy. It is what triggers the climax of the film, which sees Sophie and Jeanne seize Georges’ shotguns and murder the family who were watching an opera on television.

Jeanne leaves the crime scene and is killed in a car accident by the priest who had fired her from the charity she worked for. Sophie, for her part, walks away from the house after having wiped their fingerprints off the guns, making her way through the police squads at the accident. The end credits begin with the music of the opera that is being played back by a policeman on Melinda's tape-recorder, which Jeanne stole and put in her car. At the end of the credits, the gunshots can be heard on the tape and then the voices of Jeanne and Sophie, constituting evidence against them. Chabrol presents an ambiguous view of culture and class conflict in this film, which he jokingly called "the last Marxist film."

Reviews
Rotten Tomatoes reports 93% approval for La Cérémonie, with 26 of 28 reviews positive. On 17 April 2012, Roger Ebert added La Cérémonie to his list of "Great Movies".

The Guardian included La Cérémonie at #16 in its "25 Best Crime Films of All Time".

Craig Williams on the BFI website calls it "perhaps Chabrol’s greatest achievement", and "the consummate example of Chabrol’s genius – a ruthlessly exacting vision of class indebted to both the pulp aesthetic... and French literary tradition."

The Criterion Collection called La Cérémonie "a must-see late-career triumph [...] [that] exemplifies the New Wave auteur’s mastery of suspense and twisted psychodrama." The film is available on the Criterion Channel for streaming.

Awards and nominations
César Awards (France)
Won: Best Actress – Leading Role (Isabelle Huppert)
Nominated: Best Actor – Supporting Role (Jean-Pierre Cassel)
Nominated: Best Actress – Leading Role (Sandrine Bonnaire)
Nominated: Best Actress – Supporting Role (Jacqueline Bisset)
Nominated: Best Director (Claude Chabrol)
Nominated: Best Film
Nominated: Best Writing (Claude Chabrol and Caroline Eliacheff)
Los Angeles Film Critics (USA)
Won: Best Foreign Language Film (Claude Chabrol)
National Society of Film Critics (USA)
Won: Best Foreign Language Film
Satellite Awards (USA)
Nominated: Best Motion Picture – Foreign Language
Toronto International Film Festival (Canada)
Won: Metro Media Award (Claude Chabrol)
Venice Film Festival (Italy)
Won: Volpi Cup – Best Actress (Sandrine Bonnaire and Isabelle Huppert)
Nominated: Golden Lion (Claude Chabrol)

See also
Isabelle Huppert on screen and stage

Notes

External links
 

1995 films
1995 crime drama films
Dyslexia in fiction
French crime drama films
1990s French-language films
Films based on British novels
Films directed by Claude Chabrol
Films featuring a Best Actress César Award-winning performance
Films featuring a Best Actress Lumières Award-winning performance
Films produced by Marin Karmitz
Maids in films
1990s French films